Ferguson, LLC, headquartered in Newport News, Virginia, United States, is the largest U.S distributor of plumbing supplies, PVF, waterworks and fire and fabrication products. It is also a major distributor of HVAC equipment and industrial products and services. It ended the 2019 fiscal year with sales of $18.4 billion. This is an increase of 12.2 percent from the previous fiscal year.

History
Ferguson was founded in 1953. The company started with two locations: Lenz Supply and Smither Supply. Expansion continued throughout the Southeast and Ferguson established its headquarters in Newport News, Va.
By 1982 Ferguson began to double in size every five years and had locations in 11 states. Wolseley plc then acquired Ferguson. In 1989, Ferguson integrated with West Coast wholesale suppliers Familian and Familian Northwest.

In the late 2000s, Ferguson’s growth began to slow as the recession hit traditional construction markets. In response to the market change, Ferguson shifted the business focus on efficiency. 
Wolseley plc changed its name to Ferguson plc in 2017.
 
Ferguson Enterprises accounts for 90 percent of Ferguson plc’s trading profit and is traded on the London Stock Exchange.

In 2019, the Board of Ferguson announced an intention to demerge their UK operations so that Wolseley UK and Ferguson could focus on serving their respective customers. In the same year, activist fund Trian Fund Management LP became an investor of Ferguson Plc with a 6% stake.

Ferguson today
Ferguson’s 2019 growth trended on an upward trajectory. The company ended the 2019 fiscal year with sales of $18.4 billion, and reported a growth of 6.2 percent on an organic basis. An additional 4.2 percent of growth came from acquisitions. Ferguson employs over 27,000 associates.

Leadership
Kevin Murphy was appointed CEO in 2017. Alex Hutcherson is COO and Bill Brundage is CFO.

Acquisitions
Acquisitions are a part of Ferguson’s business model.
]

In the fiscal years before 2019, Ferguson made the following acquisitions:

 Power Equipment Direct

In the 2019 and 2020 fiscal years, Ferguson announced the following acquisitions:
 Columbia Pipe & Supply 
 S.W. Anderson
 Process Instruments
 Innovative Soil Solutions and Action Plumbing Supply 
 Mission Pipe 
 Kitchen Art

Community involvement
Ferguson has a philanthropic division known as Ferguson Cares. Ferguson is also a National Partner with Homes for Our Troops  and SkillsUSA, DIGDEEP  the mikeroweWORKS Foundation  and IWSH  Ferguson also reports efforts to support women in the skilled trades. The company won the Darden Award for Regional Leadership in 2018.

References

Business services companies established in 1953
1953 establishments in Alabama
Companies based in Newport News, Virginia
American companies established in 1953